Daniel Adams may refer to:

Daniel Adams (physician) (1773–1864), American physician, legislator, and author
Daniel Weisiger Adams (1821–1872), brigadier general in the Confederate Army
Dan Adams (1887–1964), Major League Baseball pitcher
Dan Adams (American football) (born 1984), American football linebacker
Daniel Adams (novelist) (born 1930), pseudonym of British novelist Christopher Robin Nicole
Daniel Adams (director) (born 1961), American director of the film Primary Motive
Danny Adams (born 1976), English footballer
Doc Adams (1814–1899), baseball player and executive

See also
Danielle Adams (born 1989), American basketball player
Adams (surname)